Eugene Gloria (born 1957) is a Filipino-born American poet.

Life
Eugene Gloria was born in Manila, Philippines in 1957 and raised in San Francisco, California. He attended St. Agnes School in the Haight-Ashbury and St. Ignatius College Preparatory. He earned a B.A. from San Francisco State University, M.A. from Miami University, and MFA from University of Oregon. He is the John Rabb Emison Professor of Creative and Performing Arts and Professor of English at DePauw University in Greencastle, Indiana where he teaches creative writing and English literature. He served as the Bowling Green State University College of Arts and Sciences Distinguished Visiting Writer for the 2013 spring semester. During the 2017 spring semester, he was a Fulbright Visiting Writer at the University of Santo Tomas Center for Creative Writing and Literary Studies (CCWLS).

He is the author of four books of poems, Sightseer in This Killing City (Penguin Random House, 2019), My Favorite Warlord (Penguin Books, 2012), Hoodlum Birds (Penguin Books, 2006), and Drivers at the Short-Time Motel (Penguin Books, 2000). His individual poems and prose have appeared in The American Poetry Review, TriQuarterly, Shenandoah, The New Republic, Prairie Schooner, Ploughshares, Seneca Review and Harvard Review.

He has been a scholar at the Bread Loaf Writers' Conference and a resident at the MacDowell Colony, Djerassi Artists Residency, Montalvo Arts Center, Willapa Bay Artist-in-Residence (AiR) Program, Fundación Valparaíso in Spain, Le Château de Lavigny in Switzerland, and Virginia Center for the Creative Arts in Virginia and in France.

Awards
 Fulbright Scholar Grant, University of the Philippines
 Poetry Society of America George Bogin Memorial Award
 National Poetry Series selection for Drivers at the Short-Time Motel
 Asian American Literary Award
 2013 Anisfield-Wolf Book Award
 Fulbright Lecturer Award, University of Santo Tomas
 2020 Eugene and Marilyn Glick Indiana Authors Award for Poetry

Work

Books
 Drivers at the Short-Time Motel (Penguin Books, 2000)
 Hoodlum Birds (Penguin Books, 2006)
 My Favorite Warlord (Penguin Books, 2012)
 Sightseer in This Killing City (Penguin Random House, 2019)

Anthologies

References

External links
official website
facebook

1957 births
Living people
21st-century American poets
Filipino emigrants to the United States
American poets of Asian descent
American writers of Filipino descent
San Francisco State University alumni
University of Oregon alumni
Miami University alumni
DePauw University faculty